Rubidgea is a genus of gorgonopsid from the upper Permian of South Africa and Tanzania, containing the species Rubidgea atrox. The generic name Rubidgea is sometimes believed to be derived from the surname of renowned Karoo paleontologist, Professor Bruce Rubidge, who has contributed to much of the research conducted on therapsids of the Karoo Basin. However, this generic name was actually erected in honor of Rubidge's paternal grandfather, Sydney Rubidge, who was a renowned fossil hunter. Its species name atrox is derived from Latin, meaning “fierce, savage, terrible”. Rubidgea is part of the gorgonopsian subfamily Rubidgeinae, a derived group of large-bodied gorgonopsians restricted to the Late Permian (Lopingian). The subfamily Rubidgeinae first appeared in the Tropidostoma Assemblage Zone. They reached their highest diversity in the Cistecephalus and Daptocephalus assemblage zones of the Beaufort Group in South Africa.

History of discovery

The first Rubidgea fossil was discovered by C. J. M. "Croonie" Kitching, the father of renowned paleontologist James Kitching, on the farm Doornberg outside the small town Nieu-Bethesda sometime in the 1930s. In a paper published in 1938, Robert Broom named the fossil Rubidgea kitchingi. Broom noted the large size of the new gorgonopsid fossil, stating that it was a new species. Subsequent discoveries in the following decades confirmed Broom's suspicions that a new subfamily of gorgonopsians should be categorised, and the Rubidgeinae was erected.

Description

Rubidgea was the largest African gorgonopsians and one of the largest gorgonopsians known to have lived. Rubidgea was a heavily-built, large-bodied apex predator, and sported a thick skull with long, sabre-like canines. The Rubidgeinae group as a whole were the largest gorgonopsians known to have lived, and are characterised by their robust skeletal features, particularly their skulls which are heavily-pachyostosed. The genus Rubidgea is composed of three species, R. atrox, R. platyrhina, and R. majora.

Classification
 
The Rubidgeinae are a subfamily of derived gorgonopsids that have only been found in Africa. They are composed of six genera and 17 species. The Rubidgeinae are closely related to their sister group, the Inostranceviinae, which have only been found in Russia. Out of the gorgonopsian clade, the systematics of the Rubidgeinae is the best resolved due to their distinctive character traits. The systematics of other gorgonopsian subfamilies remain chaotic due to a high degree of cranial homomorphism between taxa, making it difficult to distinguish different taxa effectively. The cladogram below (Kammerer and Rubidge 2022) displays the currently accepted systematic relationships of the Gorgonopsia.

Correlation

Numerous therapsid species, including rubidgenae gorgonopsids, are used as biostratigraphic markers in other African Basins, such as the Upper Madumabisa Mudstone Formation of Zambia, and the Chiweta Beds of Malawi. Rubidgea fossils have been recovered from the Usili Formation of Tanzania, indicating biostratigraphic correlation with upper Permian-aged deposits in South Africa. No rubidgeinae fossils have been found outside of African deposits to date, although the Inostranceviinae are considered to be their Russian counterparts.

References

Gorgonopsia
Prehistoric therapsid genera
Permian synapsids of Africa
Fossil taxa described in 1938